Widmannstätten is a lunar impact crater in the southern part of the Mare Smythii, near the eastern limb of the Moon. The rim of this crater has a wide gap along the western side, where it is joined to the larger Kiess. There is also a gap in the northern rim where the crater floor is joined to the adjacent lunar mare. The dark interior floor of this formation has been flooded by lava, leaving a level interior surface and a shallow surviving rim.

References

 LTO-81B3 Widmannstatten, Lunar Topographic Orthophotomap (LTO) Series
 
 
 
 
 
 
 
 
 
 
 
 

Impact craters on the Moon